Lion is a 2016 Australian biographical film directed by Garth Davis (in his feature debut) and written by Luke Davies, based on the non-fiction book A Long Way Home by Saroo Brierley with Larry Buttrose. Starring Sunny Pawar, Dev Patel, Rooney Mara, David Wenham and Nicole Kidman, the film focuses on Saroo Brierley, separated from his biological mother and adopted by an Australian couple, searched his biological mother via Google Earth. The film had its world premiere at the Toronto International Film Festival on 10 September 2016. The film was given a limited theatrical release on 25 November 2016, by The Weinstein Company before opening generally on 6 January 2017. The film was released in Australia on 19 January 2017 and in the United Kingdom on 20 January 2017. The film was released to positive reviews, with a Rotten Tomatoes approval rating of 84%, based on 269 reviews, and an average rating of 7.3/10. Metacritic lists a score of 69 out of 100, based on 45 reviews.

Lion received six nominations at the 89th Academy Awards, including Best Picture, Best Supporting Actor for Patel, Best Supporting Actress for Kidman, Best Adapted Screenplay, Best Original Score and Best Cinematography. At the British Academy Film Awards, the film won the BAFTA Award for Best Actor in a Supporting Role for Patel and Best Adapted Screenplay, in addition to a Best Actress in a Supporting Role nomination for Kidman and Best Original Music and Best Cinematography nominations. The film received six nominations at Critics' Choice Awards, including Best Picture, Best Supporting Actor for Patel, Best Supporting Actress for Kidman, Best Adapted Screenplay, Best Score and Best Young Performer for Pawar. The film received four nominations at Golden Globe Awards, including Best Motion Picture – Drama, Best Supporting Actor – Motion Picture for Patel, Best Supporting Actress – Motion Picture for Kidman and Best Original Score. The film received five nominations at Satellite Awards, including Best Film, Best Supporting Actor for Patel, Best Supporting Actress for Kidman, Best Adapted Screenplay and Best Editing.

Accolades

Notes

References

External links 
 

Lists of accolades by film